Monastery of the Dormition of the Theotokos may refer to:

 Monastery of the Dormition of the Theotokos, Čajniče, Bosnia and Herzegovina
 Monastery of the Dormition of the Theotokos, Dobrun, Bosnia and Herzegovina
 Monastery of the Dormition of the Theotokos, Tvrdoš, Bosnia and Herzegovina
 Simonov Monastery of the Dormition of the Theotokos, Russia (Moscow)

See also 
 Church of the Dormition of the Theotokos (disambiguation)
 Cathedral of the Dormition of the Theotokos (disambiguation)
 Dormition (disambiguation)
 Assumption (disambiguation)